The 1956 South Pacific Championship for Racing Cars was a motor race staged at the Gnoo Blas Motor Racing Circuit, near Orange in New South Wales, Australia, on Monday, 30 January 1956.
The race was contested over 27 laps, a total distance of 100 miles.
It was the feature race at the South Pacific Road Racing Championships meeting, which was organised by the Australian Sporting Car Club in conjunction with the Orange Cherry Blossom Car Racing Committee.

The race was won by Reg Hunt driving a Maserati 250F.

Results

Notes
 Race distance: 27 laps, 100 miles
 Starters: 12
 Winner's average speed: 97 mph (155 km/h)
 Fastest lap: Reg Hunt, 2m 16s, 99.5 mph (lap record)

References

South Pacific Championship for Racing Cars
Motorsport in New South Wales
Sports competitions in New South Wales